Farrokh Negahdar (born 1946) is an Iranian leftist political activist.

Born into a civil servant family, Negahdar joined the Organization of Iranian People's Fedai Guerrillas in 1963, and began studying at University of Tehran in 1965. Two years later he was arrested by SAVAK for his activities with Bijan Jazani, and resleased in 1968, being rearrested and confined until 1977. He became a member of central cadre in 1978 and led the organization's majority faction. After the Iranian Revolution, he was a member of both central and executive committees. Before the split in the party, he was elected as secretary of the central council. On 17 June 1982, he was unanimously elected as the first-secretary of the Organization of Iranian People's Fedaian (Majority).

References 

1946 births
Living people
Organization of Iranian People's Fedai Guerrillas members
United Republicans of Iran politicians